Senator Burton may refer to:

Members of the United States Senate
Harold Hitz Burton (1888–1964), U.S. Senator from Ohio from 1941 to 1945
Joseph R. Burton (1852–1923), U.S. Senator from Kansas from 1901 to 1906
Theodore E. Burton (1851–1929), U.S. Senator from Ohio from 1928 to 1929

United States state senate members
Dan Burton (born 1938), Indiana State Senate
John Burton (American politician) (born 1932), California State Senate
Konni Burton (born 1963), Texas State Senate
Terry C. Burton (born 1956), Mississippi State Senate
Walter Moses Burton (1840–1913), Texas State Senate